Stanislav Sychov (ru: Сычёв, Станислав Иванович) (December 19, 1937, Odessa, USSR – September 2, 2003, Odessa, Ukraine) was a Ukrainian artist, one of the founders of the Odessa school unofficial (underground) art.

Biography 
Stanislav Sychov was born on December 19, 1937, in Odessa.

He graduated from the Odessa Art School in 1960.

Many critics believe that organized in 1967 "Fence exhibition" of young artists and Stanislav Sychev and Valentin Khrushch on the fence of the Odessa Opera House marked the beginning of the "Odessa nonconformism". This show lasted only three hours.

In 1970 took part in the informal exhibitions in Odessa and Moscow. In 1989 he participated in the international exhibition "Impreza" in Ivano-Frankivsk. In 1989, 1994 - Personal exhibition at the Museum of Western and Eastern Art in Odessa. A significant amount of work is in private collections in Munich, Paris, London, New York, New Jersey, San Francisco.

Stanislav Sychov died on September 2, 2013, in Odessa.

References

External links 
 From the history of the Odessa avant-garde: "Fence exhibition" 
 Blog about Stanislav Sychev 
 Works by Stanislav Sychev at the NT-Art Gallery
Works by Stanislav Sychev at the Non Art Gallery 

20th-century Ukrainian painters
20th-century Ukrainian male artists
20th-century Russian male artists
20th-century Russian painters
Russian male painters
Modern painters
Soviet painters
Russian avant-garde
Artists from Odesa
1937 births
2003 deaths
Ukrainian male painters